The 1967–68 Yorkshire Football League was the 42nd season in the history of the Yorkshire Football League, a football competition in England.

Division One

Division One featured 13 clubs which competed in the previous season, along with four new clubs, promoted from Division Two:
Denaby United
Hull Brunswick
Stocksbridge Works
York City reserves

League table

Map

Division Two

Division Two featured twelve clubs which competed in the previous season, along with five new clubs.
Clubs relegated from Division One:
Harrogate Town
Scarborough reserves
Sheffield
Plus:
Lincoln United, joined from the Lincolnshire Football League
Thackley, joined from the West Yorkshire League

League table

Map

League Cup

Final

References

1967–68 in English football leagues
Yorkshire Football League